Lisboasaurus is a small (400 mm length) genus of Mesozoic crocodylomorph that lived in fresh water. It is known from fossilized tooth and jaw fragments of Late Jurassic and Early Cretaceous age. Two species have been described. In the past Lisboasaurus has been interpreted as an avialan, troodontid, or an anguimorph lizard. Both species are currently assigned to Crocodylomorpha, one is reassigned to the genus Lusitanisuchus.

Discovery and naming
In the 1960s paleontologists From the Free University Berlin located new vertebrate fossil sites that included the lignite mines of Guimarota, near the town of Leiria, Portugal. These lignites are dated by Milner and Evans, 1991, between Bathonian (middle Jurassic) to Oxfordian (early Late Jurassic) age.  Schwarz and Fechner, 2004, date them as Late Jurassic.

Seiffert, (1970, 1973), described Lisboasaurus as a genus of anguimorph lepidosaur comprising two species, L. estesi and L. mitracostatus. He subdivided the latter species into two subspecies in the first paper, but not in the second paper. In 1983 Estes listed the material as Lacertilia incertae sedis. Milner and Evans, 1991, redescribed L. estesi as a maniraptoran and, more specifically, as an early avialan or troodontid  They also cast doubt on the identification of the more poorly preserved L. mistracostatus, considering it a nomen dubium. Buscalioni and Evans et al. revised this assignment by demonstrating that the material referred to L. estesi was closely allied with an Early Cretaceous crocodylomorph (LH 7991) from Las Hoyas, Spain. Buscalioni and Evans supported the nomen dubium status of L. mistracostatus. However, Schwarz and Fechner, 2004, demonstrated that the material referred to L. mistracostatus is identical to teeth and fragments found in Porto Dinheiro, and new cranial and mandibular material collected from Guimarota between 1973 and 1982. They referred all L. mistracostatus specimens to a new genus they erected, Lusitanisuchus, creating the new name Lusitanisuchus mistracostatus.

Schwarz and Fechner (2008) described a new dentary from the Uña coal mine of Cuenca province, Spain. Its teeth demonstrate that it belongs to Lisboasaurus. This dentary was the first Lisboasaurus fossil from the Barremian age of the Early Cretaceous. The new data extracted from the dentary make it more certain that Lisboasaurus was a neosuchian crocodylomorph.

References
 J. Seiffert. (1975.) Upper Jurassic lizards from central Portugal. Contribuição para o conhecimento da Fauna do Kimerridgiano da Mina de Lignito Guimarota (Leiria, Portugal). Serviços Geológicos de Portugal, Memória (Nova Série) 22:7-85
 Buscalioni, A.D., Ortega, F., Pérez-Moreno, B.P., and Evans, S.E. (1996). "The Upper Jurassic maniraptoran theropod Lisboasaurus estesi (Guimarota, Portugal) reinterpreted as a crocodylomorph". Journal of Vertebrate Paleontology 16(2): 358–362.
 Estes, R. (1983). Sauria terrestria. Amphisbaenia. In Handbuch der Paläoherpetologie. Teil 10A. Edited by P. Wellnhofer. Gustav Fischer Verlag, Stuttgart, pp. 1–249.
 Milner, A.R., and Evans, S.E. (1991). "The Upper Jurassic diapsid Lisboasaurus estesi — a maniraptoran theropod". Palaeontology 34: 503–513.
 Schwarz, D. and Fechner, R. (2004). "Lusitanisuchus, a new generic name for Lisboasaurus mitracostatus (Crocodylomorpha: Mesoeucrocodylia), with a description of new remains from the Upper Jurassic (Kimmeridgian) and Lower Cretaceous (Berriasian) of Portugal". Canadian Journal of Earth Sciences 41: 1259–1271.
 Seiffert, J. (1970). "Oberjurassische Lacertilier aus der Kohlengrube Guimarota bei Leiria (Mittel Portugal)". Unpublished Inaugural-Dissertation, Freie Universität, Berlin, Germany.
 Seiffert, J. (1973). "Upper Jurassic Lizards from Central Portugal". Memória dos Servicos Géologicos de Portugal (N.S.) 22: 7–88.
 Schwarz, D., Fechner, R. (2008). "The first dentary of Lisboasaurus (Crocodylomorpha, ?Mesoeucrocodylia) from the Lower Cretaceous of Uña, Cuenca Province, Spain". Journal of vertebrate Paleontology 28(1): 264-268.

Late Jurassic genus first appearances
Late Jurassic crocodylomorphs of Europe
Early Cretaceous crocodylomorphs of Europe
Early Cretaceous genus extinctions
Early Cretaceous reptiles of Europe
Prehistoric pseudosuchian genera